Gandan may refer to:
Ganden Monastery near Lhasa, Tibet
Gandantegchinlen Monastery, Ulaanbaatar, Mongolia